David Williams (4 May 1877 – 12 July 1927) was a Welsh Calvinistic Methodist minister and theological tutor.

Life
Williams was born on 4 May 1877 at Holyhead, Anglesey, north Wales.  He was educated in Holyhead and in Beaumaris before moving to Oswestry where he was taught by Owen Owen.  He obtained a degree in Greek and Latin from University College, Aberystwyth in 1898, then studied classics and theology at Jesus College, Oxford.  He was appointed as the pastor of the Calvinistic Methodist church in Clifton Street, Cardiff in 1903 and was ordained in the following year.  In 1905, he became professor of Church History  at Trefeca theological college, and became professor of the New Testament in 1906 when the college moved to the  United Theological College in Aberystwyth. 

During the First World War, he was a chaplain with the Royal Welch Fusiliers from 1916 to 1918, seeing action in Egypt and Palestine.  He had a high reputation as a chaplain, preacher (in both Welsh and in English) and teacher. He wrote commentaries on Galatians and 2 Corinthians, and helped prepare revised editions in Welsh of Galatians and James. He left Aberystwyth in 1922 to teach at the Bala College, refusing a promise of the Principalship in Aberystwyth.  He died in London on 12 July 1927 after a long illness.

References

1877 births
1927 deaths
Alumni of Aberystwyth University
Alumni of Jesus College, Oxford
Welsh-speaking clergy
Welsh theologians
Welsh Methodist ministers
Royal Welch Fusiliers officers
World War I chaplains
People educated at Holyhead High School
19th-century Welsh clergy
20th-century Welsh clergy